Teracotona neumanni is a moth in the  family Erebidae. It was described by Rothschild in 1933. It is found in Ethiopia.

References

Natural History Museum Lepidoptera generic names catalog

Endemic fauna of Ethiopia
Moths described in 1933
Spilosomina